Winning America is a documentary television film about the Canadian band Said the Whale. It follows the band on their first US tour down through California, and then to South by Southwest. It premiered on CBC Television on July 23, 2011. The film was directed by Brent Hodge and Thomas Buchan, and was produced by Brent Hodge, Jon Siddall and Sheila Peacock. It was nominated for a Leo Award in 2012.

Synopsis 
The film follows the members of the band Said the Whale as they're about to embark on their first tour in the United States. It starts by introducing the members of Said the Whale, showing that even though they get a lot of radio play and have successful tours in Canada, they don't actually make enough money to live off of their music earnings so they all have separate jobs.
They play a send off show in Vancouver, and then hit the road down to California on their way to South by Southwest. The tour hits a bit of snag when their trailer gets broken into and much of their gear gets stolen (2 acoustic guitars, an entire cymbal set, 3 suitcases, 7 guitar pedals, and a microkorg).
Eventually they do make it to South by Southwest, and the rest of the documentary documents some of their shows there, some nights on the town, as well as Spencer (the drummer) getting attacked with a mustard bottle, and the band getting lemon tattoos to commemorate the trip.

The documentary concludes with the band winning a Juno Award for new band of the year, highlighting the dichotomy between being successful in Canada, and being completely unknown in the U.S.

Cast 
Ben Worcester
Tyler Bancroft
Nathan Shaw
Spencer Schoening
Jaycelyn Brown

Reception
The film received positive reviews and was nominated for a Leo Award in 2012 for Best Short Documentary Program.

References 

http://cfuv.uvic.ca/cms/?p=4920
http://thefulcrum.ca/2011/09/keep-on-keeping-on/
http://www.straight.com/blogra/said-whale-previews-cbc-documentary
http://stickymagazine.com/news/news/565-said-the-whale
http://vancouverisawesome.com/2011/07/21/said-the-whale-winning-america/
http://www.newrockstarphilosophy.com/2011/08/friday-night-music-flick-said-the-whales-winning-america-limitedtimeoffer/
http://buyingshotsforbands.com/2011/07/13/said-the-whale-documentary-to-air-on-cbc/
http://fistfulofsound.com/2011/07/find-me-to-win-said-the-whale-pre-screening-party-for-winning-america/
http://www.rickchung.com/2011/07/said-whale-winning-america-cbc.html
http://www.hellovancity.com/2011/07/15/winning-america-the-said-the-whale-documentary-media-screening-photo-gallery/

External links 
Official Site
 

2011 television films
2011 films
Canadian documentary television films
English-language Canadian films
2011 documentary films
Rockumentaries
Films directed by Brent Hodge
2010s Canadian films